Mark A. Kellner (born July 17, 1957), is a journalist living in Mesquite, Nevada. He is currently the Faith & Family reporter for The Washington Times, having previously been a freelance contributor there. 

From February 2014 to September 2015 he was a national reporter for the Deseret News, and has written about issues of faith and freedom since 1983. 

From March 11, 1991 to January 18, 2013, he wrote 1,200 weekly and, for about 18 months, semi-weekly technology columns for The Washington Times. His religion news column, "Higher Ground,"  debuted on January 25, 2013, and covered religion news and trends. It concluded one year later when Mark went to the Deseret News. 

Mark has contributed numerous news articles to Religion News Service, and was a ten-year news contributor to Christianity Today magazine. 

From 2007 to 2014, he served as News Editor for Adventist Review and Adventist World magazines, publications of the Seventh-day Adventist Church. Previously, Mark served the Adventist headquarters as Assistant Director for News and Information, running the weekly e-mail and online Adventist News Network.

Mark was a 15-month contributor to the Los Angeles Times beginning in 2000 and published 61 articles there. He has also been published on The Wall Street Journals "Taste" page and the op-ed pages of the Detroit News and The Christian Science Monitor, among other newspapers. He was editor-in-chief of PC Portables magazine, a staff writer for Government Computer News, Federal Computer Week, Defense News and Unix Today. Mark has written and published three books, including one in the "For Dummies" series and "God on the Internet."

He is a 1975 graduate of Rhodes Preparatory School in New York City, and an alumnus of the Boston University College of Communication. In 2022, Mark earned an Associate of Applied Science degree in Mass Communications from the University of the Cumberlands and is currently enrolled in a B.A. program at Southern Utah University.

References

External links 
 

1957 births
American male journalists
Living people
Los Angeles Times people
People from Fulton, Maryland
Boston University College of Communication alumni
Deseret News people
The Washington Times people